Newar Buddhism is one of the branches of Buddhism. One of the major elements of this branch of Buddhism is Mahavihara (महाबिहार) or Baha or great monastery. These monasteries have served as centers of learning in Newar Buddhism. These monasteries generally are built as a courtyard surrounded by two storied buildings consisting of halls. Some of these monasteries have been founded as early as fifth to twelfth century  Many of these mahaviharas are listed as historical monuments of Nepal. The following is a list of these mahaviharas  -

See also
 Buddhism in Nepal
 Newar Buddhism
 Kindo Baha
 Pranidhipurna Mahavihar
 Buddhist pilgrimage sites in Nepal
 List of Buddhist stotras in Nepalbhasha
 List of monasteries in Nepal
 List of stupas in Nepal
 Bahal, Nepal

References

External links
 Official Website of Itumbaha (Keshchandra Paravarta Mahavihara)
 Ancient Buddhist Monasteries of Nepal
 Youtube channel with an ongoing collection of clips of monasteries

Newar Buddhism
Buddhism in Nepal
Buddhist monasteries in Nepal